Oleg Mikhailovich Babenkov (born 21 June 1985) is a Russian former professional football player.

Club career
He made his Russian Football National League debut for FC Petrotrest Saint Petersburg on 9 May 2005 in a game against FC Avangard Kursk.

External links
 

1985 births
Footballers from Saint Petersburg
Living people
Russian footballers
Association football defenders
FC Gornyak Uchaly players
FC Tosno players
FC Luch Vladivostok players
FC Dynamo Saint Petersburg players
FC Fakel Voronezh players
FC Khimik Dzerzhinsk players
FC Petrotrest players
FC Novokuznetsk players
FC Dynamo Vologda players
FC Sokol Saratov players
FC Tekstilshchik Ivanovo players